En Vivo may refer to:

Broadcasting
 En Vivo (programadora), a Colombian programadora that operated between 1995 and 2001

Music
 En Vivo (Ana Gabriel album), 1990
 En vivo (Ha*Ash album), 2019
 En Vivo! (Iron Maiden album), 2012
 En Vivo (Kany García album), 2014
 En Vivo (Malpaís album), 2006
 En Vivo (Marco Antonio Solís album), 2000
 En Vivo, Vol. 2 (Marco Antonio Solís album), 2001
 En Vivo (Mijares album), 2001
 En Vivo (Selección Nacional de Tango album), 2007
 En vivo (Serú Girán album), 1993
 En Vivo! (The Nadas album)

See also
 
 Vivo (disambiguation)